Utrecht Centraal, officially Station Utrecht Centraal, is the transit hub that integrates three bicycle parkings, two bus stations, two tram stops and the central railway station for the city of Utrecht in the province of Utrecht, Netherlands.

Both the railway station and the bus station are the largest and busiest in the Netherlands. The bicycle parking station on the east side is the largest in the world.

The railway station has sixteen platform tracks (of which twelve are through tracks) and 207.360 embarking and disembarking passengers per day, excluding transfers. Because of its central location in the Netherlands, Utrecht Centraal is the most important railway hub of the country with more than 1000 departures per day.

History 

The first railway station at the site was opened on December 18, 1843, when the Nederlandsche Rhijnspoorweg-Maatschappij opened the first station on Utrecht territory.

In 1938, the station became the central station as the Maliebaanstation, on the other side of the city, was closed and the line from Hilversum was diverted into the central station. The station building of 1865 remained in place, though a fundamental renovation was done in 1936. Two years later, a fire burned down most of the building, which was subsequently rebuilt.

The station building was demolished in the 1970s to make way for Hoog Catharijne, then Europe's largest enclosed shopping mall, which opened on 17 December 1973. From that moment onwards, the station no longer had a real entrance; the passageways of the shopping mall just continued into the station. In 1989 the station hall was enlarged (tripling the original size) to increase capacity and to solve bottlenecks. In 1995, the station hall was again enlarged, with the construction of a new platform.

Between 2011 and 2016, the station underwent a major reconstruction as one of the NSP projects of the Dutch government and as part of a general reconstruction of the Utrecht station area. The station hall was replaced by a new, much larger hall, housing all modes of public transport. The new structure with its curved roof, was designed by Benthem Crouwel Architekten. The roof has three curves: a large one in the middle for the railway station and two smaller ones for the bus/tram stations on either side. New sheltering roofs were built for all platforms and the station was separated from the Hoog Catharijne shopping area.

A scale model of Utrecht Centraal is on display at Madurodam.

Tram and bus facilities

Light-rail (sneltram) service at Utrecht Centraal began in 1983 with the opening of the SUNIJ line (sneltram Utrecht-Nieuwegein/IJsselstein). Its tram stop (named Utrecht Centraal) was originally located on the east side of the station. In 2009, when the nearby Moreelsepark tram terminal was closed, the Centraal stop was adapted to be the new terminal for the shortened SUNIJ line. At this time, the Centraal stop was given a minor makeover including provision for the OV-chipkaart and travel information displays.

In 2013, to accommodate construction work at the railway station, the SUNIJ line was further shortened. The Centraal stop on the east side of the station was closed and replaced by a stop at Jaarbeursplein on the west side of the railway station, becoming the temporary terminal of the SUNIJ line. The temporary Jaarbeursplein terminal had 3 tracks.

In July 2016, the bus terminal on the east side of the station was also relocated to the west side ('Jaarbeurszijde'). This move made space available on the east side of the station for the construction of a new Centrumzijde (downtown side) bus and tram terminal as well as the construction of a new tram line (Uithoflijn), a new station square (Stationsplein), a bicycle storage facility and the Moreelse bridge.

On 9 December 2019, the Centrumzijde bus and tram terminal opened at Utrecht Centraal. It is located under the main hall on the east side of the railway station, and riders can access it directly from the main hall. On 16 December 2019, the Uithof line (Uithoflijn, tram route 22) started operation running from Centrumzijde to P+R Science Centre in the Uithof district. Passengers who wanted to transfer between the SUNIJ and Uithof lines had to walk  between the Jaarbeursplein and Centrumzide stops. There was a track between the two stops, but it was used only for Uithof trams returning to the depot without passengers. The platform heights for the SUNIJ and Uithof lines were incompatible.

On 4 July 2020, the SUNIJ line was shut down for renovation including rebuilding the Jaarbeursplein stop. The stop was converted from a terminal for high-floor trams to a through-station for longer, low-floor trams. The old platforms were demolished, and the stub siding was eliminated. New side platforms were built along the through-tracks. Electrical overhead wires and track switches were also replaced. On 3 January 2021, the Jaarbeursplein tram stop reopened with low-level platforms.

On 2 July 2022, through-passenger service started between the Jaarbeursplein and Centrumzijde stops, thus eliminating the 500-metre walking transfer between the two stops at Utrecht Centraal. Trams would travel via the station between Nieuwegein and IJsselstein on the SUNIJ line and the Uithof district on the Uithof line (Uithoflijn).

Redesign of the track layout 

As the central hub of the Dutch railway network, disruptions at Utrecht Centraal can easily affect the rest of the country's railway network. 2–3 times per year, such disruptions led to a snowball effect, resulting in a total standstill of railway traffic in a wide area around Utrecht Centraal.

As part of a general effort to improve the reliability of the Dutch railway network and because of the High-Frequency programme (PHS) of the Dutch government, it was decided to remodel the track layout of the station, an investment of €270 million.

Reasons for the redesign 
The Ministry of Infrastructure described the reasons for the project as follows:

The problem of the old layout 
 Insufficient capacity for the desired intensities of passenger and freight trains. This concerns railway infrastructure capacity as well as transfer capacity.
 Insufficient quality of the railway service. The punctuality of the passenger service in Utrecht is structurally lower than in the rest of the country.
 Insufficient robustness of the infrastructure. The layout is complex, vulnerable to failure and expensive due to the large number of switches and crossing movements.

The main measures 
 Limited extension of the infrastructure as far as possible within the available space: one extra platform with two tracks. Other platforms were modified based on the larger passenger numbers.
 Better use and optimisation of the existing infrastructure: separating train traffic flows form each other, with a fixed platform allocation per corridor, less switches, higher speeds and shorter headways.

The goals 
 Increased capacity, allowing more trains and more transfers.
 Shorter travel times. The speed for freight and passenger trains is increased from 40 km/h to 80 km/h. 
 Higher reliability
 Less failures due to a reduction in switches, less crossing movements and a simplified traffic control.
 In case a disruption does happen, its effect will be limited to one corridor. 
 More buffers to deal with the consequences of disruptions within the corridor.

The design: learning from Japan 
The idea for the new track layout was based on the layout of Shinagawa station in Tokyo. Based on Shinagawa and other Japanese examples, a new design philosophy for track layout was developed within ProRail. It contains the following hierarchy:

 The main traffic flows are physically separated from each other (as far as possible within the given space) and have their own dedicated tracks.
 The layout of these tracks is optimized for speed and headways, this is the main function of the stations.
 Additional switches are added for reaching the depots. In the case of Utrecht, there are three depots and each platform track has access to at least one depot.
 As a last step, switches are added where necessary to enable traffic management in case of disruptions. These switches have to fulfill a number of conditions:
 The switches for disruption management cannot compromise the main function.
 Switches are only added for a fixed number of disruption scenarios (alternative platform track, complete or partial blockage of a line).
 For each switch, a cost benefit analysis is made (including financial and operational aspects, such as delay minutes). Only switches with a positive result are included in the final design.

The result 
The new layout has around 60 switches (compared to around 200 for the old layout) and results in a doubling of capacity.

This capacity growth is due to the separating of the flows, the shorter headways and the extra platform. A part of this capacity growth is used for the implementation of the PHS High Frequency Programme, in which the basic frequency of several corridors is increased from 4 to 6 trains per hour. The station has capacity for a basic frequency of 8 trains per hour on all corridors, which makes it future proof for the foreseen growth up to 2040.

Train services
International, national and local train services call at the station, most notably the Intercity-Express and NightJet trains to Germany, Switzerland and Austria, domestic Intercity services to all parts of the Netherlands, and local (Sprinter) services providing access to towns all over Utrecht province. Freight services also pass through the station, on the Amsterdam – Betuweroute – Ruhr corridor as well as the Antwerp – Northeast Germany corridor.

The following passenger services call at Utrecht Centraal, adding up to around 70 departures per hour (2022 timetable):

Tracks 1–4: Sprinter (local) services North & Northeast 

2x per hour Utrecht – Hilversum – Almere (4900)
2x per hour Utrecht – Hilversum – Weesp – Schiphol – Hoofddorp (5700)
2x per hour Utrecht – Den Dolder – Baarn (5500)
2x per hour Utrecht – Den Dolder – Amersfoort – Zwolle (5600)
1x per hour Utrecht – Utrecht Maliebaan (28300, Railway museum)

Tracks 5/7 and 18/19: Intercity / International services Northwest, South & East 

1 daily Intercity-Express Amsterdam – Utrecht – Cologne – Frankfurt Airport – Basel
6 daily Intercity-Express Amsterdam – Utrecht – Cologne – Frankfurt Airport – Frankfurt am Main
1 daily NightJet Amsterdam – Utrecht – Zurich
1 daily NightJet Amsterdam – Utrecht – Vienna / Innsbruck
2x per hour (Schagen -) Alkmaar – Amsterdam – Utrecht – Eindhoven – Maastricht (800), cross-platform connection with:
2x per hour Schiphol – Utrecht – Arnhem – Nijmegen (3100)
2x per hour Den Helder – Amsterdam – Utrecht – Arnhem – Nijmegen (3000), cross-platform connection with:
2x per hour Schiphol – Utrecht – Eindhoven – Venlo (3500)
2x per hour Enkhuizen – Amsterdam – Utrecht – Eindhoven – Heerlen (3900), cross-platform connection with:
2x per hour Rotterdam – Schiphol – Utrecht – Arnhem (3200)

Tracks 8–12: Intercity services Northeast & West 

1x per hour Rotterdam – Utrecht – Amersfoort – Zwolle – Leeuwarden (600)
1x per hour Rotterdam – Utrecht – Amersfoort – Zwolle – Groningen (500)
1x per hour The Hague – Utrecht – Amersfoort – Hengelo – Enschede (1700)
1x per hour The Hague – Utrecht – Amersfoort – Amersfoort Schothorst (11700)
2x per hour The Hague – Utrecht – Amersfoort (– Deventer, peak hours only) (2000)
2x per hour Rotterdam – Utrecht (2800)

Tracks 14/15: Sprinter (local) services Northwest & East 

2x per hour Breukelen – Utrecht – Driebergen-Zeist (– Veenendaal Centrum, peak hours only) (7300)
2x per hour Uitgeest – Amsterdam – Breukelen – Utrecht – Veenendaal Centrum – Rhenen (7400)
1x per hour Night Intercity (Nachtnet)  Rotterdam – The Hague – Amsterdam – Utrecht (1400)

Tracks 20/21: Sprinter (local) services West & South 

2x per hour The Hague – Woerden – Utrecht – Geldermalsen – Tiel (6900)
2x per hour Leiden – Woerden – Utrecht – Geldermalsen – 's-Hertogenbosch (non-stop between Woerden and Utrecht) (8800)
2x per hour (Leiden, peak hours only –) Woerden – Utrecht (– Houten Castellum, peak hours only) (8900)

Timetable 
The train services are scheduled in such a way, that there is a basic frequency of an Intercity and a Sprinter every 15 minutes in every direction from Utrecht Centraal. The Intercity trains on the routes Amsterdam – Utrecht, Schiphol – Utrecht, Utrecht – Arnhem and Utrecht – Eindhoven run every 10 minutes.

Some services run only during the peak hour, but on most lines the basic frequency is offered all day. On Sunday mornings and late evenings some services do not run, but even during those times, there is always an Intercity and a Sprinter at least every 30 minutes in every direction.

Bus services
Utrecht Centraal has two bus stations. One on the east side of the railway station (Busstation Centrumzijde) and the other on the west side (Busstation Jaarbeurszijde). The majority of the bus services in and around the city is operated by Qbuzz under the U-OV brand. Syntus Utrecht (Keolis) and Arriva operate some of the regional bus services.

Busstation Centrumzijde
 2 Centraal Station – City Centre – Museumkwartier – Centraal Station (circular, one direction)
 3 Centraal Station – Overvecht – Zuilen – Centraal Station (circular, both directions)
16 Leidsche Rijn – Lombok – Centraal Station – Vredenburg
18 De Meern Oost > Langerak > Centraal Station > Rijnsweerd (peak hour only)
 28 Vleuten – Vleuterweide – De Meern – Centraal Station – Wittevrouwen – Rijnsweerd – Science Park (U-Link)

Busstation Jaarbeurszijde
 1 Hoograven – Rivierenwijk – Centraal Station – Overvecht Noord
 4 Voordorp – Tuindorp – Centraal Station – Langerak – Terwijde
 5 Centraal Station – Oog in Al – Terwijde – Maarssen
 6 Galgenwaard – Sterrenwijk – Centraal Station – Overvecht Zuid
 7 Zuilen – Ondiep – Centraal Station – Kanaleneiland Zuid
 8 Lunetten – Tolsteeg – Centraal Station – Wilhelminapark
 12 Centraal Station – Zuilen – Maarssen
18 Rijnsweerd > Centraal Station > Langerak > De Meern Oost (peak hour only)
 24 Centraal Station – Papendorp – Oudenrijn (peak hour only)
 38 Centraal Station – Lage Weide – Maarssen
 41 Utrecht Centraal – Bunnik – Wijk bij Duurstede (U-Link)
 47 Utrecht Centraal – Hoograven – Houten
 50 Utrecht Centraal – Zeist – Doorn – Veenendaal / Wageningen (U-Link)
 55 Utrecht Centraal – Tuindorp-Oost – Maartensdijk
 63 Utrecht Centraal – Vianen
 65 Utrecht Centraal – Plettenburg – Vianen
 73 Zeist-Centrum – Utrecht Centraal – Leidsche Rijn – Maarssen (U-Link)
 74 Driebergen-Zeist – Zeist West – Utrecht Centraal – Jutphaas – Vianen
 77 Nieuwegein-Centrum – Galecop – Utrecht Centraal -De Bilt – Bilthoven Station (U-Link)
 81 Utrecht Centraal – Meerkerk
 85 Utrecht Centraal – Schoonrewoerd – Leerdam
 90 Utrecht Centraal – Papendorp – Gelkenes Industrieterrein
 94 Utrecht Centraal – Papendorp – Ameide
 102 Utrecht Centraal – Woerden
 107 Utrecht Centraal – Gouda
 120 Utrecht Centraal – Breukelen – Amsterdam Bijlmer ArenA
 195 Utrecht Centraal – Rotterdam Capelsebrug (peak hour only)
 241 Utrecht Centraal – Wijk bij Duurstede (via A12, peak hour only)
 247 Utrecht Centraal – Kanaleneiland – Houten (peak hour only)
285 Utrecht Centraal – Papendorp – Leerdam (peak hour only)
 295 Utrecht Centraal – Rotterdam Capelsebrug
 387 Utrecht Centraal – Gorinchem
 388 Utrecht Centraal – Sliedrecht – Rotterdam Kralingse Zoom
 400 Utrecht Centraal – Vianen – Sleeuwijk Tol – Raamsdonksveer – Oosterhout (Brabantliner)
 401 Utrecht Centraal – Vianen – Sleeuwijk Tol – Hank – Breda (Brabantliner)

International bus services (Flixbus, Ecolines) call at a separate bus stop near the station.

Tram services
Utrecht Centraal has two light rail (sneltram) stops: Jaarbeursplein on the west side of the station, and  Centrumzijde ("downtown side") on the east side of the station. There are three tram routes passing Utrecht Centraal; all three routes stop at both the Jaarbeursplein and Centrumzijde stops. 
Tram 20: Nieuwegein-Zuid – Nieuwegein Stadscentrum – P+R Westraven – Jaarbeursplein – Centrumzijde – P+R Science Park 
Tram 21: IJsselstein-Zuid – Nieuwegein Stadscentrum – P+R Westraven – Jaarbeursplein – Centrumzijde – P+R Science Park  
Tram 22: Centrumzijde – P+R Science Park

On weekdays until 21:30, all three routes travel between Centrumzijde and P+R Science Park (in the Uithof district). In late evening, and on weekends or holidays, there is no service to P+R Science Park at which times tram routes 20 and 21 will terminate at Centrumzijde, and there is no tram 22 service.

Bicycles
On both sides of the station, there is a large three-floor bicycle parking station. The parking on the east side is the world's largest bicycle parking station. It opened fully on the 19th of August 2019 at the cost of an estimated €48 million and holds 12,500 bicycles.

References

External links

NS website
Dutch Public Transport journey planner

Centraal
Railway stations on the Centraalspoorweg
Railway stations on the Rhijnspoorweg
Railway stations on the Staatslijn H
1843 establishments in the Netherlands
Railway stations in the Netherlands opened in 1843
Transit centers in the Netherlands